The Men's Individual Road Race of the 2012 UCI Road World Championships cycling event took place on 23 September in the province of Limburg, Netherlands.

The race was won by Belgium's Philippe Gilbert, after he made a late attack on the final ascent of the Cauberg climb and advanced clear of the rest of the field to win his first world title and the first by a Belgian since Tom Boonen won in Madrid in 2005. He finished four seconds clear of Norway's Edvald Boasson Hagen, who claimed the silver medal, while the bronze medal went to Spain's Alejandro Valverde, who finished a second further behind. When the announcement was made of the course, Gilbert was the instant favourite and rode all year with this pressure. Leading into the worlds he had won only two races all season.

Route
The race started in Maastricht and ended in Valkenburg. The first  was contested through a number of Limburg cities before the riders entered a  circuit to be completed on ten occasions.

Final classification

References

External links

Men's road race
UCI Road World Championships – Men's road race